Unión Deportiva Gran Tarajal Sociedad Tamasite, or simply UD Gran Tarajal, is a Spanish football team based in Gran Tarajal, Tuineje, Fuerteventura, in the Canary Islands. Founded in 1925, the club competes in Tercera División – Group 12, holding home games at Estadio Municipal de Gran Tarajal, with a capacity of 3,000 people.

Former players

  Ge Wenjun - Current player/president of the club
  Yuan Yung-cheng - Taiwan youth international player

Season to season

2 seasons in Tercera División

References

External links
BDFutbol team profile
Soccerway team profile

Football clubs in the Canary Islands
Association football clubs established in 1925
1925 establishments in Spain